Sir Harold Josiah Finch (2 May 189816 July 1979)  was a Welsh  Labour Party politician born in Barry, Glamorgan. He was a miners' agent in Blackwood after the First World War, Finch was a contemporary of Aneurin Bevan and accompanied him as a miners' delegate to the Labour Party Conference in Liverpool in 1925. He was elected as Member of Parliament for Bedwellty at the 1950 general election and was Under-secretary of State at the Welsh Office from 1964 to 1966 during Harold Wilson's first administration. He held the seat until he retired from the House of Commons at the 1970 general election.  His successor was Neil Kinnock, who later became a leader of the Labour Party.

Finch was knighted in the 1976 Birthday Honours for his services to politics and the trade union movement. He was the first 'Freeman' of Islwyn Borough Council and the Sir Harold Finch Memorial Park was created in 1982 at Pontllanfraith.

He died on 16 July 1979 in Newport, aged 81.

References

1898 births
1979 deaths
Knights Bachelor
Ministers in the Wilson governments, 1964–1970
National Union of Mineworkers-sponsored MPs
UK MPs 1950–1951
UK MPs 1951–1955
UK MPs 1955–1959
UK MPs 1959–1964
UK MPs 1964–1966
UK MPs 1966–1970
Welsh Labour Party MPs